Leptosia nupta, the immaculate wood white, petite wood white or immaculate spirit, is a butterfly in the family Pieridae. It was described by Arthur Gardiner Butler in 1873. It is found in Nigeria, Cameroon, Gabon, the Republic of the Congo, Angola, the Democratic Republic of the Congo, Uganda, Rwanda, Kenya, Tanzania, Zambia, Zimbabwe and on Madagascar. The habitat consists of wet, primary forest.

The larvae feed on Capparis species and Rorippa madagascariensis.

Subspecies
Leptosia nupta nupta (eastern Nigeria, Cameroon, Gabon, Congo, Angola)
Leptosia nupta pseudonupta Bernardi, 1959 (Democratic Republic of the Congo, Uganda, Rwanda, western Kenya, western Tanzania, Zambia, Zimbabwe)
Leptosia nupta viettei Bernardi, 1959 (Madagascar)

References

External links
Seitz, A. Die Gross-Schmetterlinge der Erde 13: Die Afrikanischen Tagfalter. Plate XIII 10 1

Butterflies described in 1873
nupta
Taxa named by Arthur Gardiner Butler
Butterflies of Africa